Sankt Agatha is a municipality in the district of Grieskirchen in the Austrian state of Upper Austria.

Geography
Sankt Agatha lies in the Hausruckviertel. About 30 percent of the municipality is forest, and 65 percent is farmland.

References

Cities and towns in Grieskirchen District